The USA Memory Championship is an annual competition that took place every spring in New York City until 2016, and is currently held in Orlando, Florida, after an online qualifier. It was founded by Tony Dottino, President of Dottino Consulting Group, Inc., and Marshall Tarley in 1997. Designed to test the limits of the human brain, the USA Memory Championship is an organized competition in which Memory Athletes (MAs) attempt to memorize as much information as possible in events such as Names and Faces, Cards, Random Numbers, Images, and guest information at a fictional "Tea Party". Since 2018, there is also often an event called Long-Term Memory in which the MAs are given reams of data a month in advance about a wide variety of subjects such as the Period Table of the Elements, Space Shuttle missions, NFL Hall-of-Famers, etc. Participation is open to US citizens who are at least 12 years of age. The competition currently consists of 9 total events, 5 of which are online qualifying events, while the last four events are held at a live event to determine the champion.

Events

Until 2020, there were four qualifying events in the first part of the competition:

 Names and Faces: memorize up to 117 names (first and last) and faces in 15 minutes. 20 minutes are given to write down the names of each face, but in a different order than on the memorization sheet.
 Speed Numbers: memorize as many digits as possible within five minutes. 20 digits are placed in each row with 25 rows per page. After memorization MAs are given 10 minutes for recall. For every complete row memorized in order, 20 points are given. For every row that has any mistakes, 0 points will be given. 
 Speed Cards: memorize the order of a shuffled deck of playing cards as quickly as possible. A judge sits by the MA with a stopwatch to record the time. After memorization, 5 minutes are given for recall. After the recall the MA is given another set of cards in perfect order (i.e. diamonds 2, diamonds 3, diamonds 4 ..... etc.), and is then told to place the cards in the same order as the first deck memorized. Two trials are given and the best score will be counted. The MA with the fastest time wins. 
 Poetry: memorize an unpublished poem within 15 minutes. 20 minutes are given for recall, in which the competitors must transcribe the poem word for word from beginning to end in the same format as the original. Each MA is allowed to omit two consecutive lines from the poem. Scoring is graded based on correct spelling, punctuation, and capitalization. Each line has its own number of points and each mistake made will result in zero points for the line where the mistake was found.

After the first four events, eight mental athletes then advanced to the final round of Championship events. A round-robin tournament style was used for elimination. Three Competitors were eliminated after the first event, two after the second, and two during the third to determine the Memory Champion.

 Spoken Words: memorize a list of 200 words (in order) in 15 minutes. After the period of memorization is over Memory Athletes are called by random, and are given 15 seconds to orally recite the first word of the first column. The words continue consecutively down the list and the first MA to either recall the wrong word or not remember the word is eliminated.  
 Three Strikes You're Out: The five MAs left in this round are given 15 minutes to hear and review facts about 6 strangers. Facts for each stranger includes their address, phone number, pet, favorite hobbies, favorite car, and favorite foods. It is scored like spoken words, but each MA is given three strikes before elimination.
 Double Deck O’Cards: The remaining three competitors are given five minutes to memorize two decks of cards (104 cards). Each deck is arranged before the event in the same order identical to the other MA's decks. The first two MAs to make a mistake are eliminated. In the case of a tie, both decks would be shuffled together in identical order for both MAs.

Since 2020, the format of the event has changed. There is now an online qualifier consisting of five events: two from the popular brain-training site Lumosity, and three events from the online memory competition website Memory League. The two events from Lumosity have typically been Memory Match Overdrive and Rotation Matrix, while the events from Memory League have been Images, Names, and Numbers. Usually, 12 MAs qualify to advance to the live event, typically held several months later. The live event is similar to the championship round of prior years, with the exception of the addition of a new event, Long-Term Memory. As in prior years, the MAs are eliminated through the first three events until three MAs remain for the last event, the Double Deck 'O Cards, where the champion is crowned after the elimination of the runners-up.

Preparation
Although the competition is open to US citizens over the age of 12, the winners tend to have prepared for years. By learning how to create a loci (memory palace), and other methods such as the PAO (Person Action Object) system, and Major system, MAs are able to memorize randomized digits, cards, and poetry and much more. A competitor, Joshua Foer was able to win the 2006 competition with only one year of preparation by using these techniques and practicing every day. He wrote about his journey under the wing of a British Mental Athlete Ed Cooke who set him on his path of memory in his book Moonwalking with Einstein.

Champions
This is a list of USA memory champions since 1998:

 1998 - Tatiana Cooley-Marquardt
 1999 - Tatiana Cooley-Marquardt
 2000 - Tatiana Cooley-Marquardt
 2001 - Scott Hagwood
 2002 - Scott Hagwood
 2003 - Scott Hagwood
 2004 - Scott Hagwood
 2005 - Ram Kolli
 2006 - Joshua Foer
 2007 - David Thomas
 2008 - Chester Santos
 2009 - Ron White
 2010 - Ron White
 2011 - Nelson Dellis
 2012 - Nelson Dellis
 2013 - Ram Kolli
 2014 - Nelson Dellis
 2015 - Nelson Dellis
 2016 -  Alex Mullen
 2017 - no competition was held
 2018 - John Graham
 2019 - Lance Tschirhart
 2020 - Makenna Good
 2021 - Nelson Dellis
 2022 - John Graham

Records 
Records for the fastest times and the most points in individual events.
 Names and Faces: Nelson Dellis (2019) 235 points
 Speed Numbers: Alex Mullen (2016) 483 digits
 Poetry: Katherine He (2016) 335 points
 Speed Cards: Alex Mullen (2016) 52 cards in 18.653 seconds

See also 
 Art of memory
 Memory sport
 Method of loci
 Mnemonist
 World Memory Championships
 Extreme Memory Tournament
 Grand Master of Memory
 Moonwalking with Einstein
 Nelson Dellis
 Chester Santos
 Alex Mullen

References 

1997 establishments in New York City
Memory games
Annual events in New York City
Competitions in New York City
Recurring events established in 1997